Antiarins are cardiac glycoside poisons produced by the upas tree (Antiaris toxicaria). There are two forms, α-antiarin and β-antiarin.

β-Antiarin 
β-Antiarin, a cardiac glycoside steroid, can be isolated from upas tree latex (Antiaris toxicaria). Its use ranges from medical use, such as hypertension treatment, to arrow poison application. It also proves to be more poisonous than curare, sporting a low LD50 of 0.1 mg/kg in most mammals.

To date, β-antiarin has only been isolated from the upas tree by the scientist H. Kiliani in 1896; no synthetic synthesis has yet been achieved.

Symptoms of β-antiarin poisoning 
Upon β-antiarin poisoning, when observed in animals such as frogs and small mammals, visible symptoms include muscle spasms — particularly of the head and neck — and excess defecation. Paralysis can also be presented before death. The primary physiological system affected is the cardiac muscle, though gastro-intestinal tissue has also been known to be severely affected by this type of poisoning. Convulsions and spasms are not immediate, especially when the chemical is too diluted in water. In animal tests, time of death resulted anywhere from 5–30 minutes after administration.
When used as an arrow poison, beta-antiarin produces twitches in the target, which then become full convulsions, unconsciousness, and final death through cardiac arrest.

Toxicity of β-antiarin

During tests performed on frogs and mammals, it was found that the minimum lethal dose for an amphibian was 1/300th mg. For a 300-400 g guinea pig, this lethal dose increased to 0.75 mg. Lethal dose for felines is 0.094 mg/kg, using intravenous injection. Meanwhile, 1 mg will kill a dog.

Physiological systems affected/medical properties 
β-Antiarin is administered to the body through injection. Once inside the body, the chemical will affect muscular and cardiac tissues. A heart attack occurs because beta-antiarin affects Na+K+-ATPase cardiac-muscle membrane activity.

However, the very effect that allows β-antiarin to be a poison also gives it medicinal properties. It limits the sodium ion (Na+) concentration by blocking the Na+ pump, which then promotes calcium ions (Ca2+) to increase in concentration in the extracellular cardiac muscle domain, therein permitting the heart to contract. The mechanism through which sodium and calcium ions are exchanged, known as the sodium-calcium exchanger, allows for the exchange of ions to occur at a rate of 3:1 respectively. The cardiac cell exhibits a positive potential during ventricular systole, becomes depolarized, and permits calcium ions to rush in by the sodium-calcium exchanger. From here, the contraction occurs when the calcium ions leave and the cell re-polarizes. If the dosage of cardiac glycoside (i.e. beta-antiarin) doubles, then the substance becomes a poison.

Cultural references 

The earliest known use of β-antiarin as an arrow poison was with the Li people in China, circa 581. Other cultures, such as the peoples of the Dayak tribe, Berusu, Punan, and Basap in Borneo, southeast Asia, have also used the sap of the upas tree for poisoned darts. Indigenous people would collect the sap in a bamboo fixture (or upas leaf if amount needed is small), then place over an open flame for a week. Extreme care was taken to make sure the sap does not boil over; to make sure the poison was not lost, small taste tests would be performed as the sap continues to be dehydrated. A sweet taste would indicate that the sugar arrangement (L-rhamnose) in beta-antiarin broke, thus ruining the potency of the poison and freeing the sugar into the sap. Final poisonous sap would be a dark black, metallic colour and have a bitter taste; this is usually achieved at the end of seven days. The sap can then be used to coat the arrow tips, and its potency continues to be effective for years as long as care is taken to make sure the tip is not re-exposed to heat. Even hardened, stored poison could still be lethal when reconstructed with the root sap of Derris elliptica, or strychnos, or snake poison. The arrows could be used for hunting as well as defense; if the tissue surrounding the arrowhead was cut off and the meat cooked, the poison's L-rhamnose sugar would break off, rendering it useless.

References 

Plant toxins
Cardiac glycosides
Rhamnosides
Aldehydes
Polyols
Furanones